Tall is an English surname which derived from the Old French word 'de Taille' meaning someone great in height, and it came to England after the Norman Conquest. Notable people with the surname include:

 Ahmadu Tall (1836–1897), Malian imam
 Amadou Tidiane Tall (born 1975), Burkinabé footballer
 David O. Tall (born 1941), British educator
 El Hadj Umar Tall (c. 1797 – 1864), West African politician
 Gora Tall (born 1985), Senegalese footballer
 Ibrahim Tall (born 1981), Senegalese footballer
 JoAnn Tall (21st century), American environmentalist
 Lida Lee Tall (1873–1942), American university president
 Mamadou Tall (born 1982), Burkinabé footballer
 Modou Tall (born 1953), Senegalese basketball player
 Mountaga Tall (born 1956), Malian politician
 Siraj Al Tall (born 1982), Jordanian footballer
 Stephen Tall (1908–1981), American writer
 Stephen Tall (politician) (born 1977), British politician
 Tidiani Tall (c. 1840 – 1888), Caliph of the Toucouleur Empire
 Tom Tall (1937–2013), American singer